A  was the office of a daikan (magistrate) during the Edo period (18th & 19th century) of Japanese history.

External links
  
 

Edo period
Legal history of Japan